Ndala is a village in Ancuabe District in Cabo Delgado Province in northeastern Mozambique.

Ndala is a common name in central and southern parts of Africa.
Ndala has two main meanings:

1. Ndala is an honorific title given to a royal family or a royal generation ( specially in some tribes of Republic Democratic of Congo). It can also be translated as Prince or Princess. 

2. Ndala also means palm branches. In Africa, the palm branch represents a symbol of triumph and victory, also a symbol of joy and celebration. The palm branch is also often used on a house of a bereaved family as a sign of comfort and a reminder that there is hope in resurrection. Ndala is basically a name to inspire joy and consolation.

References

External links 
Satellite map at Maplandia.com 

Populated places in Ancuabe District